Hermann Julius Oberth (25 June 1894 – 28 December 1989) was a Transylvanian Saxon physicist and engineer. He is considered one of the founding fathers of rocketry and astronautics, along with Robert Esnault-Pelterie, Konstantin Tsiolkovsky, Robert Goddard and Herman Potočnik. During WWII, he supported Nazi Germany's Aggregat rocket program.

Early life

Oberth was born to a Transylvanian Saxon family in Nagyszeben (Hermannstadt), Kingdom of Hungary (today Sibiu in Romania). He was fluent in Hungarian and in the Romanian language.  At the age of 11, Oberth's interest in rocketry was sparked by the novels of Jules Verne, especially From the Earth to the Moon and Around the Moon. He was fond of reading them over and over until they were engraved in his memory. As a result, Oberth constructed his first model rocket as a school student at the age of 14. In his youthful experiments, he arrived independently at the concept of the multistage rocket. However, during this time, he lacked the resources to put his ideas into practice.

In 1912, Oberth began studying medicine in Munich, Germany, but after World War I broke out, he was drafted into the Imperial German Army, assigned to an infantry battalion, and sent to the Eastern Front against Russia. In 1915, Oberth was moved into a medical unit at a hospital in Segesvár (German: Schäßburg; Romanian: Sighișoara), Transylvania, in Austria-Hungary (today Romania). There he found the spare time to conduct a series of experiments concerning weightlessness, and later resumed his rocketry designs.

On 6 July 1918, Oberth married Mathilde Hummel, with whom he had four children. Among these were a son who died as a soldier in World War II, and a daughter named Ilse Oberth (1924-1944) who was a rocket technician at the Redl-Zipf (code name Schlier) V-2 rocket engine test facility and liquid oxygen plant and was killed when there was an accidental explosion on August 28, 1944. In 1919, Oberth once again moved to Germany, this time to study physics, initially in Munich and later at the University of Göttingen.

In 1922, Oberth's proposed doctoral dissertation on rocket science was rejected as "utopian". However, professor Augustin Maior of the University of Cluj in Romania offered Oberth the opportunity to defend his original dissertation there in order to receive a doctorate. He did so successfully on 23 May 1923. He next had his 92-page work published privately in June 1923 as the somewhat controversial book, Die Rakete zu den Planetenräumen ("The Rocket into Planetary Space"). By 1929, Oberth had expanded this work to a 429-page book titled Wege zur Raumschiffahrt ("Ways to Spaceflight"). Oberth commented later that he made the deliberate choice not to write another doctoral dissertation. He wrote, "I refrained from writing another one, thinking to myself: Never mind, I will prove that I am able to become a greater scientist than some of you, even without the title of Doctor." Oberth criticized the German system of education, saying "Our educational system is like an automobile which has strong rear lights, brightly illuminating the past. But looking forward, things are barely discernible."

Oberth became a member of the Verein für Raumschiffahrt (VfR) – the "Spaceflight Society" – an amateur rocketry group that had taken great inspiration from his book, and Oberth acted as something of a mentor to the enthusiasts who joined the Society, which included persons such as Wernher von Braun, Rolf Engel, Rudolf Nebel or Paul Ehmayr. Oberth lacked the opportunities to work or to teach at the college or university level, as did many well-educated experts in the physical sciences and engineering in the time period of the 1920s through the 1930s – with the situation becoming much worse during the worldwide Great Depression that started in 1929. Therefore, from 1924 through 1938, Oberth supported himself and his family by teaching physics and mathematics at the Stephan Ludwig Roth High School in Mediaș, Romania.

Rocketry and space flight 
In parts of 1928 and 1929, Oberth also worked in Berlin as a scientific consultant on the film, Frau im Mond ("The Woman in the Moon"), which was directed and produced by the great film pioneer Fritz Lang at the Universum Film AG company. This film was of enormous value in popularizing the ideas of rocketry and space exploration. One of Oberth's main assignments was to build and launch a rocket as a publicity event just before the film's premiere. He also designed the model of the Friede, the main rocket portrayed in the film.

On 5 June 1929, Oberth won the first (Robert Esnault-Pelterie - André-Louis Hirsch) Prix REP-Hirsch of the French Astronomical Society for the encouragement of astronautics in his book Wege zur Raumschiffahrt ("Ways to Spaceflight") that had expanded Die Rakete zu den Planetenräumen to a full-length book. The book  is dedicated to Fritz Lang and Thea von Harbou.

Oberth's student Max Valier joined forces with Fritz von Opel to create the world's first large-scale experimental rocket program Opel-RAK, leading to speed records for ground and rail vehicles and the world's first rocket plane. Opel RAK.1, a purpose-built design by Julius Hatry, was demonstrated to the public and world media on September 30, 1929, piloted by von Opel. Valier's and von Opel's demonstrations had a strong and long-lasting impact on later spaceflight pioneers, in particular on another of Oberth's students, Wernher von Braun.

Shortly after the Opel RAK team's successful liquid-fuel rocket launches of April 10 and 12, 1929 by Friedrich Wilhelm Sander at Opel Rennbahn in Rüsselsheim, Oberth conducted in the autumn of 1929 a static firing of his first liquid-fueled rocket motor, which he named the Kegeldüse. The engine was built by Klaus Riedel in a workshop space provided by the Reich Institution of Chemical Technology, and although it lacked a cooling system, it did run briefly. He was helped in this experiment by an 18-year-old student Wernher von Braun, who would later become a giant in both German and American rocket engineering from the 1940s onward, culminating with the gigantic Saturn V rockets that made it possible for man to land on the Moon in 1969 and in several following years. Indeed, Von Braun said of him:

In 1938, the Oberth family left Sibiu, Romania, for good, to first settle in Austria, then in Nazi Germany, then in the United States, and finally back to a democratic West Germany. Oberth himself moved on first to the Technische Hochschule in Vienna, Austria, then to the Technische Hochschule in Dresden, Germany. (A Technische Hochschule at that time was a technical college offering advanced professional training in selected fields, rather than an institution also engaged in basic research as a university.)

Oberth moved to Peenemünde, Germany, in 1941 to work on the Aggregat rocket program. Around September 1943, he was awarded the Kriegsverdienstkreuz I Klasse mit Schwertern (War Merit Cross 1st Class, with Swords) for his "outstanding, courageous behavior ... during the attack" on Peenemünde by Operation Hydra, part of Allied operations against the German rocket programme.

Later he worked on solid-propellant anti-aircraft rockets at the German WASAG military organization near Wittenberg. Around the end of World War II in Europe, the Oberth family moved to the town of Feucht, near the regional capital of Nuremberg, which became part of the American Zone of occupied Germany, and also the location of the high-level war-crimes trials of the surviving Nazi leaders. Oberth was allowed to leave Nuremberg to move to Switzerland in 1948, where he worked as an independent consultant and a writer.

In 1950, Oberth moved on to Italy, where he completed some of the work that he had begun at the WASAG organization for the new Italian Navy. In 1953, Oberth returned to Feucht, Germany, to publish his book Menschen im Weltraum (Mankind into Space), in which he described his ideas for space-based reflecting telescopes, space stations, electric-powered spaceships, and space suits.

During the 1950s and 1960s, Oberth offered his opinions regarding unidentified flying objects (UFOs). He was a supporter of the extraterrestrial hypothesis for the origin of the UFOs that were seen from Earth. For example, in an article in The American Weekly magazine of 24 October 1954, Oberth stated, "It is my thesis that flying saucers are real, and that they are space ships from another solar system. I think that they possibly are manned by intelligent observers who are members of a race that may have been investigating our earth for centuries..." He also wrote an article in the second edition of Flying Saucer Review titled "They Come From Outer Space". He discussed the history of reports of "strange luminous objects" in the sky, mentioning that the earliest historical case is of "Shining Shields" reported by Pliny the Elder. He wrote, "Having weighed all the pros and cons, I find the explanation of flying discs from outer space the most likely one. I call this the "Uraniden" hypothesis, because from our viewpoint the hypothetical beings appear to come from the sky (Greek – 'Uranos')."

Oberth eventually came to work for his former student, Wernher von Braun, who was developing space rockets for NASA in Huntsville, Alabama. (See also List of German rocket scientists in the United States.) Among other things, Oberth  was involved in writing the study, The Development of Space Technology in the Next Ten Years. In 1958, Oberth was back in Feucht, Germany, where he published his ideas on a lunar exploration vehicle, a "lunar catapult", and on "muffled" helicopters and airplanes. In 1960, back in the United States again, Oberth went to work for the Convair Corporation as a technical consultant on the Atlas rocket program.

Space Mirror 
In 1923, Oberth first described his space mirrors with a diameter of 100 to 300 km in his book „Die Rakete zu den Planetenräumen“(The Rocket to the Planetary Spaces), which are said to consist of a grid network of individually adjustible facets.

Space mirrors in orbit around the earth, as designed by Hermann Oberth, are intended to focus sunlight on indiviual regions oft he earth’s surface or deflect it into space so that the solar radiation is weakened in a specifically controlled manner for individual regions on the earth’s surface.

It is therefore not a question oft he weakening oft he solar radiation on the entire exposed surface oft he earth, as would be the case when considering the establishment of shading areas at Lagrange point between the sun and the earth.

These giant mirrors in orbit could be used to illuminate individual cities, as a mens of protection against natural disasters, to control weather and climate, to create addional living space for tens of billions of people, Hermann Oberth writes. The fact that one could influence the trajectories of he barometric high and low pressure areas with these spatial mirrors seemed most important to Oberth. Such an intervention in the earth's climate is one of the methods of Climate engineering have not yet been sufficiently researched to be applicable.

Further publications followed, in which he took into account the technical progress achieved up to that point: 1929 „Ways to Spaceflight“, 1957 „Menschen im Weltraum. Neue Projekte für Raketen- und Raumfahrt“ (People in Space. New Projects for Rocket and Space) and 1978 „Der Weltraumspiegel“ (The Space Mirror). For cost reasons, Hermann Oberth’s concept envisages that the components on the moon  should be produced from lunar minerals, because ist lower gravitational pull requires less energy to launch the components into lunar orbit. In addition, the earth’s atmosphere is not burdened by many rocket launches. From the lunar surface, the components would be launched into the lunar orbit by an electromagnetic lunar slingshot and „stacked“ at a 60° libration point. From there, the components could be tranported into orbit with the electric spaceships he had designed with litle recoil, and there they would be assembled into mirrors with a diameter of 100 to 300 km. In 1978 he estimated that the realization could be expected between 2018 and 2038.

Hermann Oberth pointed out that these mirrors could also be used as a weapon. This circumstance als well as the complexity of this project could only make these mirrors a reality as a peace project of mankind.

In the year 2023, the space mirror invented by Oberth is to be classified as part of CLIMAT ENGINEERING under the heading SOLAR RADIATION MANAGEMENT (SRM) under SPACE-MIRRORS. The risks of such intended interventions in weather and climate are also diccussed there.

Later life 

Oberth retired in 1962 at the age of 68. From 1964 to 1967 he was a member of the National Democratic Party of Germany, which was considered to be far right. In July 1969, Oberth returned to the United States to witness the launch of the Apollo project Saturn V rocket from the Kennedy Space Center in Florida that carried the Apollo 11 crew on the first landing mission to the Moon.

The 1973 oil crisis inspired Oberth to look into alternative energy sources, including a plan for a wind power station that could utilize the jet stream. However, his primary interest during his retirement years was to turn to more abstract philosophical questions. Most notable among his several books from this period is Primer For Those Who Would Govern.

Oberth returned to the United States to view the launch of STS-61-A, the Space Shuttle Challenger launched 30 October 1985.

Oberth died in Nuremberg, West Germany, on 28 December 1989, just shortly after the fall of the Iron Curtain.

According to an obituary by Stille Hilfe, Oberth was "a loyal supporter and donor" of this Nazi support organization.

Legacy 
 

Hermann Oberth is memorialized by the Hermann Oberth Space Travel Museum in Feucht, Germany, and by the Hermann Oberth Society. The museum brings together scientists, researchers, engineers, and astronauts from the East and the West to carry on his work in rocketry and space exploration.

He discovered the Oberth effect, in which a rocket engine when traveling at high speed generates more useful energy than one travelling at low speed.

In 1980, Oberth was inducted into the International Air & Space Hall of Fame at the San Diego Air & Space Museum.

There is also a crater on the Moon and asteroid 9253 Oberth named after him.

The Danish Astronautical Society has named Hermann Oberth an honorary member.

The Faculty of Engineering of Lucian Blaga University of Sibiu is named after him.

In Star Trek III: The Search for Spock, the USS Grissom was classified as an Oberth-class starship. Several other Oberth-class starships also appeared in subsequent Star Trek films and television series.

Books 
 Die Rakete zu den Planetenräumen (1923) (By Rocket into Planetary Space) (in German) 
 Ways to Spaceflight (1929) 
 The Moon Car (1959) 
 The Electric Spaceship (1960) 
 Primer for Those Who Would Govern (1987) 
 Georgiy Stepanovich Vetrov, ''S. P. Korolyov and space. First steps. — 1994 M. Nauka,  .
 S. P. Korolev. Encyclopedia of life and creativity" – edited by C. A. Lopota, RSC Energia. S. P. Korolev, 2014

See also 
 Robert H. Goddard
 Conrad Haas
 High altitude wind power
 Outer space
 Konstantin Tsiolkovsky
 Gernot M. R. Winkler
 List of German inventors and discoverers
 List of Romanian inventors and discoverers

References

External links 
 The Hermann Oberth Space Museum

1894 births
1989 deaths
20th-century German engineers
People from Sibiu
Transylvanian Saxon people
People from the Kingdom of Hungary
Early rocketry
Early spaceflight scientists
German expatriates in the United States
20th-century German physicists
20th-century Hungarian physicists
German essayists
German Lutherans
German people of World War II
German Army personnel of World War I
Members of the Romanian Academy elected posthumously
Babeș-Bolyai University alumni
Knights Commander of the Order of Merit of the Federal Republic of Germany
Research and development in Nazi Germany
Rocket science pioneers
German male essayists
20th-century essayists
20th-century German male writers
20th-century Lutherans
Austro-Hungarian emigrants to Germany